Fritz Dällenbach (born 25 September 1911, date of death unknown) was a Swiss athlete. He competed in the men's decathlon at the 1936 Summer Olympics. His descendants also compete in decathlon.

References

1911 births
Year of death missing
Athletes (track and field) at the 1936 Summer Olympics
Swiss decathletes
Olympic athletes of Switzerland
Place of birth missing